Dudman may refer to:
 Dudman, Iran (disambiguation)
 Graham Dudman (born 1963), a British newspaper editor
 Leonard Dudman (1933–2004), a Scottish international cricketer
 Nick Dudman, a British make-up effects and creature designer for films
 Richard Dudman (1918–2017), an American journalist
 Roger Dudman (died 1990), an English Labour Party Mayor of Oxford
 Vic Dudman (1935–2009), an Australian logician and teacher of logic